Geldner is a surname. Notable people with the surname Geldner include:

 Georges Geldner (1872–unknown), Swiss football player
 Karl Friedrich Geldner (1852–1929), German linguist
 Karl Geldner (1927–2017), German politician
 Max Geldner (1875–1958), Swiss football player
 Niko Geldner (born 1972), is a German-Swiss biologist 
 Roland Geldner (1870–1905), Swiss businessman